Pecorari is an Italian surname. Notable people with the surname include:

Adam Pecorari (born 1984), American racing driver
Antonio Carlos Pecorari (born 1962), commonly known as Tatu, Brazilian football coach and former player
Anselmo Guido Pecorari (born 1946), Italian Roman Catholic archbishop and diplomat
Marco Pecorari (born 1977), Italian footballer
Robbie Pecorari (born 1987), American racing driver

Italian-language surnames